The Minhe Formation is a geological formation in northwestern China, whose strata date back to the Late Cretaceous period.

Dinosaur remains are among the fossils that have been recovered from the formation.

Vertebrate paleofauna

Dinosaurs
A tyrannosaur tooth with a split carina has been recovered from the Minhe Formation in China.

See also 

 List of dinosaur-bearing rock formations

References

Bibliography 
 Molnar, R. E., 2001, Theropod paleopathology: a literature survey: In: Mesozoic  Vertebrate Life, edited by Tanke, D. H., and Carpenter, K., Indiana University  Press, p. 337-363.
 Weishampel, David B.; Dodson, Peter; and Osmólska, Halszka (eds.): The Dinosauria, 2nd, Berkeley: University of California Press. 861 pp. .

Upper Cretaceous Series of Asia